Brian Nicholas (born 20 April 1933) is a Welsh former professional footballer, who played as a wing half.

Career
Born in Aberdare, Nicholas played for Queens Park Rangers, Chelsea, Coventry City and Rugby Town.

References

1933 births
Living people
Welsh footballers
Association football wing halves
Queens Park Rangers F.C. players
Chelsea F.C. players
Coventry City F.C. players
Rugby Town F.C. (1945) players
English Football League players
London XI players
Footballers from Aberdare